The Stripes were a German pop band founded on 2 July 1979 in the town of Hagen by Rainer Kitzmann, who played guitar. The lead singer was Gabriele Susanne Kerner, before she became known as Nena Kerner, who would later form the band Nena. Another future member of the band Nena, Rolf Brendel (Nena's boyfriend at the time), played the drums. Frank Röhler played bass. The band was known for singing exclusively in English. They released five singles and one studio album, after which they split up on 3 March 1982. Their song "Ecstasy" was a minor hit.

Discography

Studio album
The Stripes was the band's only album and the first studio album of its singer, Gabriele "Nena" Kerner. Initially an LP record, it was re-released on CD in 1997 and again in 2004 with bonus tracks which were previously exclusive to some singles.

Track listing
Side A contains tracks 1–6 and side B contains tracks 7–13.

Notes
 Track 8 is a cover of a Hall & Oates song

Credits
Gabriele Kerner vocals
Rainer Kitzmann guitar
Rolf Brendel – drums and percussion
Frank Röhler bass guitar
Andy Kirnberger keyboard, assorted guitars, singing harmony and producer
Manfred Nauner recording engineer at Tonstudio Hiltpoltstein
Nigel Jobson English vocals on tracks 4 and 9, recording and mixing engineer at Hotline Studios
Udo Arndt mixing engineer at Audio Tonstudio, Berlin

Singles
All singles were released as 7-inch vinyl records at 45 RPM under the CBS label. "Ecstasy" and the B-sides "Normal Types" and "Lose Control" were included as bonus tracks on the re-release of the studio album.

Epilogue

Nena has often advertised her involvement with The Stripes in 2003 when she made a guest appearance at Howard Jones's 20th anniversary concert in London, she wore a top emblazoned with the name of the band and the bonus tracks of the Made in Germany Live album included live performances of two of the Stripes' songs recorded at a Berlin concert in November 2009.

References

External links
 
 

German pop music groups
English-language singers from Germany
1979 establishments in West Germany
Musical groups established in 1979
People from Hagen
Musical groups from North Rhine-Westphalia
Musical groups disestablished in 1982
CBS Records albums
Nena albums